The Orange Line, also known as the Abdul Sattar Edhi Line, is a  bus rapid transit line of the Karachi Metrobus in Karachi, Sindh, Pakistan. It is the smallest of the five Metrobus lines in the city. The expected daily ridership is estimated at 50,000. The route goes from Board Office to Gulshan-e-Zia (Orangi Town). It was inaugurated on 10 September 2022.

History
Originally named the Orange Line, construction began on 11 June 2016. Chief Minister of Sindh Syed Qaim Ali Shah inaugurated the construction work, while Rs. 2 billion were earmarked by the Government of Sindh for the project's completion. National Engineering Services Pakistan served as the consultants, with principal engineer Rehan Zamin serving as the project manager. On 13 December 2016, the Government of Sindh renamed the Orange Line after the late philanthropist Abdul Sattar Edhi, in recognition of his services to the poor.

Initially planned to be completed in one year, the project faced numerous delays, which meant it could not become operational until 2022.

The Orange Line was formally inaugurated on 10 September 2022 and began operations the same day. Twenty air-conditioned buses are to be plied on the route, each with a capacity of 90 passengers. The ticket fares range from Rs.10 to Rs.20.

Route

The Orange Line goes from Board Office to Orangi town till TMO office, spanning about 4 kilometers. The line has the capacity to carry up to 50,000 passengers daily with a station after every kilometer. Three of the four stations are at ground level, while one is elevated. Each station is 6 meters wide and 70 meters long.

See also 
 Karachi Metrobus
 Green Line - Karachi Metrobus
 Yellow Line - Karachi Metrobus
 Blue Line - Karachi Metrobus
 Red Line - Karachi Metrobus
 Brown Line - Karachi Metrobus
 Lahore Metrobus
 Rawalpindi-Islamabad Metrobus
 Multan Metrobus
 Peshawar Metrobus

References

Karachi Metrobus
 Transport
Bus rapid transit
Bus rapid transit in Pakistan